Scrobipalpa bradleyi is a moth in the family Gelechiidae. It was described by Povolný in 1971. It is found in Algeria, Tunisia, southern Spain, Sicily and southern France.

There are mixed greyish and whitish scales on the forewings. The former are concentrated along the margins and at the apex. The hindwings are shining grey-whitish.

The larvae feed on Arthrocnemum fruticosum.

References

Scrobipalpa
Moths described in 1971